The Šumbar Lake complex in Karlovac County, Croatia, consists of  several large lakes, among which are Veliki Bajer (Big Lake), Desni Bajer (Right Lake) or Dugi Bajer (Long Lake) and Eko Lake.  The lakes are in a resort area and are utilized primarily for sport fishing. Among other species, anglers catch carp, amur and perch.

Geography
The lakes lie about 7 km northeast of Karlovac in the middle of a forested area, north of the Kupa river.  The Šumbar Lake complex is not naturally occurring.  The first lake formed in an area where clay had been excavated starting in the 19th century. Veliki Bajer (Big Lake) was excavated for clay starting in 1969.

External links
 

Lakes of Croatia
Landforms of Karlovac County